Xinjiekou may refer to the following locations in China:

Xinjiekou, Beijing, area in Xicheng District, Beijing
Xinjiekou Station (Beijing), subway station serving the area of the same name in Beijing.
Xinjiekou, Nanjing, street in Nanjing
Xinjiekou Station (Nanjing), subway station serving the street of the same name in Nanjing.